The 2016 CEB Cup, the inaugural tournament of a new, annual European baseball competition, was held from June 1, to June 5, 2016. It was hosted in Rouen, France, and Chartres, France.

List of competing teams

First round

Pool A 

|}

Pool B 

|}

Second round
Pool C

|}

Semi-finals

|}

Third round
7th/8th Playoff

|}

Vienna Wanderers were relegated to the Federations Cup.

There will be no 5th/6th playoff so both teams will finish in joint 5th place.

3rd/4th Playoff

|}

Final

|}
Rouen Huskies were promoted to the CEB Champions Cup.

References

See also
 European Baseball Championship
 Asia Series
 Caribbean Series
 Baseball awards#Europe

European Cup (baseball)
International baseball competitions in Europe
International baseball competitions hosted by France